Forte de São João Batista do Brum (often simply Forte do Brum) is a fort located in Recife, Pernambuco in Brazil.

See also
History of Pernambuco

References

External links

Sao Joao
Buildings and structures in Recife
Portuguese colonial architecture in Brazil